Juan Marasigan Feleo (February 28, 1948 – November 19, 2009), better known as Johnny Delgado, was a Filipino television and movie actor, comedian, and writer. He is best known for his television work on the TV gag show Goin' Bananas. Other roles include the films Kakabakaba Ka Ba? and Tanging Yaman. The latter won him the FAMAS Award and the Metro Manila Film Festival Award for Best Actor in 2000.

Personal life
He was born as Juan Marasigan Feleo on February 29, 1948 in Manila. He is the son of Ben Feleo, a film director, and Victorina Marasigan, an educator. Johnny had his formal education at Colegio de San Juan de Letran.

He was the husband of actress-director Laurice Guillen and the father of actresses Anna Feleo and Ina Feleo. Besides his work in film and television, he also appeared in the Philippine version of Coca-Cola's TV commercial for Cherry Coke. He was posthumously inducted to the Philippines Eastwood City Walk of Fame in December 2010 one year after his death.

Illness and death
Delgado was diagnosed with cancer in 2008. Early that year, Delgado assured that he was responding well to chemotherapy. A healthy and strong Delgado went so far to attend the birthday celebration of Sen. Jinggoy Estrada in February 2009. He announced there that he was in remission.

According to an ABS-CBN News source, the cancer returned. He was brought to St. Luke's Hospital in Quezon City. He was discharged on a Tuesday. He died on November 19, 2009 of lymphoma on a Thursday. He was interred at Loyola Memorial Park in Marikina 5 days later on Tuesday, November 24, 2009. his father died two years.

Partial filmography

Film

Labing-labing (2009, short film) – his last movie role. Directed by his daughter Ina Feleo, co-starring his wife Laurice Guillen
Urduja (2008)
You Got Me! (2007)
Summer Heat (2006)
La Visa Loca (2005)
Santa Santita (2004) – actor and co-writer
Pakners (2003)
Kailangan Kita (2002)
Hari ng Selda: Anak ni Baby Ama 2 (2002)
Tanging Yaman (2000)
Hindi Pa Tapos ang Laban (1994) ..... Congressman
Macario Durano (1994) .... Velasquez
Elsa del Castillo Story (1994)
Tatak ng Kriminal (1993)
Sala sa Init Sala sa Lamig (1993)..... Valero
Kanto Boy: Alyas Totoy Guwapo (1992)
Hanggang May Buhay (1992)
Pacifico Guevarra: Dilinger (1992)
Patayin si Billy Zapanta (1992)
Kamay ng Garuda (1992)
Kahit Buhay Ko (1992) .... Chef Dinero
Eddie Tagalog: Pulisyante ng Mandaluyong (1992)
Emong Verdadero: Tatak ng Cebu II (Bala ng Ganti) (1992) .... Guido Medrano
Amang Capulong: Anak ng Tondo II (1992) 
Alyas Boy Kano (1992) .... Alvarez
Lumayo Ka Man sa Akin (1992) .... Jaime
Contreras Gang (1991) .... Tinyente Pascual 
Alyas Pogi 2 (1991) .... Active Footage
Mayor Latigo (1991) .... Romero
Alyas Ninong: Huling Kilabot ng Tondo (1991) .... Kapitan Tamayo
Medal of Valor: Habang Nasusugatan Lalong Tumatapang (1991) .... Kumander Dayang 
Alyas Pogi: Birador ng Nueva Ecija (1990) .... Hepe Rogelio Banzon 
Dadaan Ka sa Ibabaw ng Aking Bangkay (1990)
Hindi Pahuhuli ng Buhay (1989) 
Joe Pring: Homicide, Manila Police (1989)
A Dangerous Life (1988) .... Lt. Col. Eduardo "Red" Kapunan, Jr.
Tubusin mo ng Dugo (1988) .... Lt. Piodoroda
Pepeng Kuryente: Man with a Thousand Volts (1988) .... Richard
Balweg (1987) - Ka George
Bukas ng Sabado agi Buka Sa Sabitan (1986)
Batang Quiapo (1986) - RigorAng Padrino (1984)Misteryo sa Tuwa (1984)Alyas Baby Tsina (1984)Bad Bananas sa Puting Tabing (1983)M.I.B.: Men in Brief (1983) – Francis PhillipsMga Uod at Rosas.  (1982)
San Basilio (1981) – Señor Escobar
Aguila (1980)
Brutal (1980)
Kakabakaba Ka Ba? (1980)
Ang Alamat ni Julian Makabayan (1979)
Jaguar (1979)
Banaue (1975)
Bawat Kanto Basagulo (1968)

Television
May Bukas Pa (2009) (ABS-CBN) – guest role. This was his last television appearance.
Kamandag (2008) (GMA Network)
Maria Flordeluna (2007) (ABS-CBN)
Global Shockers (2006 - 2007) (ABC) – Host
Calla Lily (2006) (ABS-CBN)
Mga Anghel na Walang Langit (2005) (ABS-CBN)
Te Amo, Maging Sino Ka Man (2004) (GMA Network)
All Together Now (2003) (GMA Network)
Kay Tagal Kang Hinintay (2002) (ABS-CBN)
Maynila (2001) (GMA Network)
Arriba, Arriba! (2000) (ABS-CBN)
1896 (ABC 5) (1996)
Noli Me Tangere (PTV 4) (1995–1996)
Maalaala Mo Kaya (1991–2009) (ABS-CBN)
A Dangerous Life (television film; 1988)
Lovingly Yours (1987–1996) (GMA Network)
Goin' Bananas (1986-1991) (IBC/ABS-CBN)

Awards

FAMAS Awards
2007 – Kaleldo – Best Actor
2006 – La Visa Loca –  Supporting Actor
2001 – Tanging Yaman – Best Actor (won)
1995 – Macario Durano – Best Supporting Actor
1993 – Lumayo Ka Man sa Akin – Best Supporting Actor
1990 – Joe Pring: Homicide Manila Police (1989) – Best Supporting Actor
1988 – Balweg – Best Supporting Actor
1981 – Kakabakaba ka ba? – Best Supporting Actor
1980 – Ang Alamat ni Julian Makabayan -Best Supporting Actor
1977 – Mrs. Teresa Abad ako po si Bing (1976)-Best Supporting Actor
1976 – Banaue -Best Supporting Actor

FAP Awards, Philippines
2007 – Ligalig – Best Supporting Actor (won)
2006 – La Visa Loca – Best Supporting Actor (won)
2005 – Santa Santita – Best Screenplay (with Jerry Gracio and Michiko Yamamoto)
also nominated for Best Supporting Actor

Gawad Urian Awards
2006 – La Visa Loca – Best Supporting Actor
2003 – Kailangan Kita -Best Supporting Actor
2001 – Tanging – Best Actor
1993 – Lumayo Ka Man sa Akin -Best Supporting Actor
1982 – Salome – Best Actor
1981 – Kakabakaba ka ba? – Best Supporting Actor (won)
Brutal – Best Actor / Best Supporting Actor

Metro Manila Film Festival
2006 – Ligalig – Best Supporting Actor (won)
2000 – Tanging Yaman – Best Actor (won)
1979 – Ang Alamat ni Julian Makabayan – Best Supporting Actor (won)

References

External links

1948 births
2009 deaths
20th-century comedians
Burials at the Loyola Memorial Park
Colegio de San Juan de Letran alumni
Deaths from cancer in the Philippines
Deaths from lymphoma
Filipino male comedians
Filipino male film actors
Filipino television personalities
Male actors from Manila